Andrew Fitzsimmons Martin (22 September 1896 – 1978) was a Scottish footballer who played league football as a wing half for Blackpool, Halifax Town, Rochdale, and Torquay United as well as non-league football for a number of other clubs.

References

Blackpool F.C. players
Halifax Town A.F.C. players
Rochdale A.F.C. players
Torquay United F.C. players
Kilwinning Rangers F.C. players
Ardrossan Winton Rovers F.C. players
Goole Town F.C. players
Scottish footballers
People from Wigtown
Association football wing halves
1896 births
1978 deaths